Phrynus garridoi is a species of Amblypygi in the family of Phrynidae.

Distribution
The species is endemic to Guerrero in Mexico. It is also found in Acapulco and Tierra Colorada.

Description

Etymology
The species is named in honour of Orlando H. Garrido.

Original publication
Armas, 1994 : Nueva especie de Phrynus (Amblypygi: Phrynidae) del estado de Guerrero, México. AvaCient, .

References

External links

Amblypygi